Richard Pell (17 October 1966) is an English former professional rugby league footballer who played in the 1980s and 1990s, and coached in the 2000s and 2010s.

Background
Richard Pell's birth was registered in  Pontefract district, West Riding of Yorkshire, England.

Playing career

Club career
Richard Pell made his début for Wakefield Trinity during April 1985.

Genealogical information
Richard Pell is the older brother of Elizabeth Jane Pell (birth registered during third ¼  in Pontefract district).

References

External links
 Player Statistics at rugbyleagueproject.org
 Coach Statistics at rugbyleagueproject.org

1966 births
Living people
Doncaster R.L.F.C. players
English rugby league coaches
English rugby league players
English rugby union administrators
Hunslet R.L.F.C. players
Newcastle Thunder coaches
Rugby league players from Pontefract
Rugby league props
Wakefield Trinity players